Ramillies is a municipality of Wallonia located in the Belgian province of Walloon Brabant. On 1 January 2012, Ramillies had a total population of 6,211. The total area is 48.68 km² which gives a population density of 128 inhabitants per km².

The municipality consists of the following districts: Autre-Église, Bomal, Geest-Gérompont-Petit-Rosière, Grand-Rosière-Hottomont, Huppaye, Mont-Saint-André, and Ramillies-Offus.

The former Roman road from Bavay to Cologne passes through Ramillies. Just to the north of the road, also within the municipality, the Hottomont tumulus is one of the most significant tumuli in Belgium.

See also
Battle of Ramillies

References

External links

Municipality website

 
Municipalities of Walloon Brabant